Gliese 667 Cc (also known as GJ 667Cc, HR 6426Cc, or HD 156384Cc) is an exoplanet orbiting within the habitable zone of the red dwarf star Gliese 667 C, which is a member of the Gliese 667 triple star system, approximately  away in the constellation of Scorpius. The exoplanet was found by using the radial velocity method, from radial-velocity measurements via observation of Doppler shifts in the spectrum of the planet's parent star.

Physical characteristics

Mass, radius and temperature
Gliese 667 Cc is a super-Earth, an exoplanet with a mass and radius greater than that of Earth, but smaller than that of the giant planets Uranus and Neptune. It is heavier than Earth with a minimum mass of about 3.7 Earth masses. The equilibrium temperature of Gliese 667 Cc is estimated to be . It is expected to have a radius of around 1.5 , dependent upon its composition.

Host star 

The planet orbits a red dwarf (M-type) star named Gliese 667 C, orbited by a total of two planets. The star is part of a trinary star system, with Gliese 667 A and B both being more massive than the smaller companion. Gliese 667 C has a mass of 0.31  and a radius of 0.42 . It has a temperature of 3,700 K, but its age is poorly constrained, estimates place it greater than two billion years old. In comparison, the Sun is 4.6 billion years old and has a surface temperature of 5,778 K. This star is radiating only 1.4% of the Sun's luminosity from its outer atmosphere. It is known to have a system of two planets: claims have been made for up to seven, but these may be in error due to failure to account for correlated noise in the radial velocity data. Since red dwarfs emit little ultraviolet light, the planets likely receive minimal amounts of ultraviolet radiation.

Gliese 667 Cc is the second confirmed planet out from Gliese 667 C, orbiting towards the inner edge of the habitable zone. From its surface, the star would have an angular diameter of 1.24 degrees and would appear to be 2.3 times the visual diameter of the Sun as it appears from the surface of the Earth. Gliese 667 C would have a visual area 5.4 times greater than that of the Sun but would still only occupy 0.003 percent of Gliese 667 Cc's sky sphere or 0.006 percent of the visible sky when directly overhead.

The apparent magnitude of the star is 10.25, giving it an absolute magnitude of about 11.03. It is too dim to be seen from Earth with the naked eye, and even smaller telescopes cannot resolve it against the brighter light from Gliese 667 A and B.

Orbit 
The orbit of Gliese 667Cc has a semi-major axis of 0.1251 astronomical units, making its year 28.155 Earth-days long. Based on its host star's bolometric luminosity, GJ 667 Cc would receive 90% of the light Earth does; however, a good part of that electromagnetic radiation would be in the invisible infrared part of the spectrum.

Habitability 

Based on black body temperature calculation, GJ 667 Cc should absorb a similar, but slightly higher, amount of overall electromagnetic radiation than Earth, making it a little warmer and consequently placing it slightly closer to the "hot" inner edge of the habitable zone than Earth. According to PHL, Gliese 667 Cc is (as of July 2018) the fourth-most Earth-like exoplanet located in the conservative habitable zone of its parent star.

Its host star is a red dwarf, with about a third as much mass as the Sun. As a result, stars like Gliese 667 C have the ability to live up to 100–150 billion years, 10–15 times longer than the Sun's lifespan.

The planet is likely tidally locked, with one side of its hemisphere permanently facing towards the star, and the opposite side being dark and cold. However, between these two intense areas, there could be a sliver of habitability—called the terminator line, where the temperatures may be suitable (about ) for liquid water to exist. Additionally, a much larger portion of the planet may be habitable if it supports a thick enough atmosphere to transfer heat to the side facing away from the star.

However, in a 2013 paper, it was revealed that Gliese 667 Cc is subject to tidal heating 300 times that of Earth. This in part is due to its small eccentric orbit around the host star. Because of this, the chances of habitability may be lower than originally estimated.

History

Discovery 
Gliese 667 Cc was first announced in a pre-print made public on 21 November 2011 by the European Southern Observatory's High Accuracy Radial Velocity Planet Searcher (HARPS) group using the radial velocity method (Doppler method). The announcement of a refereed journal report came on 2 February 2012 by researchers at the University of Göttingen and the Carnegie Institution for Science and backing up the ESO HARPS group discovery.

Potentiality of survival
According to astrobiologists, there is a slight potential chance of eventual survival for humans to sustain on a usually Earth-like exoplanet within a directly hostile environment.

In fiction
Gliese 667 Cc features in the story "The Audience" by Sean McMullen in the June 2015 issue of Analog Science Fiction and Fact. In the Alien vs. Predator franchise, Gliese 667 Cc was the first planet to be terraformed, being done so by the Weyland Corporation in 2039. It is also mentioned in the 2015 novel Not Alone by Craig A. Falconer. This planet is also featured in Allen Steele's 2016 novel Arkwright. Gliese 667 Cc is also the setting of the 2020 video game In Other Waters.

See also

KELT-4Ab, another exoplanet in a triple star system
LTT 1445 is a triple M-dwarf system with one planet orbiting LTT 1445A
List of potentially habitable exoplanets

References

Notes 

Exoplanets detected by radial velocity
Exoplanets discovered in 2012
6
Gliese 667
Near-Earth-sized exoplanets in the habitable zone
Super-Earths
Scorpius (constellation)
Articles containing video clips